10 Little Rubber Ducks is a 2005 children's book by Eric Carle. The book, based on a factual incident, follows ten rubber ducks as they are tossed overboard and swept off in ten different directions when a storm strikes a cargo ship.

Reception
Kirkus Book Reviews wrote: "Laura Ingalls Wilder Award–recipient and perennial favorite Carle revisits the counting-book format with his unmistakable blocky, painted collages. All of his well-known components are present: a list of animals—many of them recognizable from earlier works—repeated words and phrases, bright friendly art on lots of white background, and a noisemaker at the end" and "While not Carle’s best work, it still has those saturated colors that have such appeal."

References

2005 children's books
American picture books